WJC may refer to:
 Williamsburg-James City County Public Schools, Virginia
 William Jefferson Clinton (born 1946), the 42nd president of the United States (1993-2001)
 Wessel Johannes "Hansie" Cronje (1969–2002), South African cricketer
 World Jewish Congress, an international federation of Jewish communities and organizations founded 1936
 World Junior Ice Hockey Championships, an annual event organized by the International Ice Hockey Federation (IIHF) for national under-20 ice hockey teams from around the world